The Đakovo Cathedral or Cathedral basilica of St. Peter is the cathedral of the Roman Catholic Archdiocese of Đakovo-Osijek in Đakovo, Croatia.

Đakovo Cathedral is the biggest sacral newly built building of Croatian historicism. The St. Peter Cathedral in Đakovo is the town's most famous landmark and the most important sacral object.

The cathedral was built 1866-1882 under Josip Juraj Strossmayer, who was the bishop of the Catholic diocese of Đakovo and Srijem. The architects of the cathedral are Carl Roesner and Friedrich von Schmidt from Vienna. Fresco paintings depicting scenes from the Old Testament in the nave and the New Testament scenes from the life of St Peter in the chancel were executed by the Roman painters of German origin Alexander Maximillian and Lodovico Seitz, except for two frescoes which were painted by Achille Ansiglioni. The scenes from the life of St Peter were partially made according to the drawings created for Đakovo Cathedral by one of the leading Nazarene painters Friedrich Overbeck.

The landscaped park from the 19th century near the bishop's palace is a horticultural monument under special protection as well as the nearby Small Park (Mali Park) dating from the turn of the 19th/20th century.

Đakovo Cathedral was built in 4 years, and another 12 years was spent decorating the inside.

References

Sources
 Cepelić, Milko; Pavić, Matija, Josip Juraj Strossmayer, biskup bosansko-đakovački i srijemski, God. 1850-1900, Tisak dioničke tiskare, Zagreb, 1900-1904.
 Damjanović, Dragan,  "Karl Rösner's First Design for Đakovo Cathedral from 1854", Prostor, Architecture and Urban Planning Scientific Journal, Nr. 15 (2007), 1 (33), Zagreb, 2007, pp. 2–25.
 Damjanović, Dragan, "Projects for Đakovo Cathedral from the End of the 18th and the Beginning of the 19th Century", Peristil, Nr. 50, pp 141–56, Zagreb, 2007.
 Damjanović, Dragan, "Stylistic Features in Karl Rösner's Working Designs from 1865 and 1867 for the Cathedral in Đakovo", Prostor, Architecture and Urban Planning Scientific Journal, Nr. 16 (2008), 1 (35), Zagreb, 2008, pp. 48–63
 Damjanović, Dragan, "National Ideologies and 19th Century Art on the Example of Frescoes in the Đakovo Cathedral Apses", Društvena istraživanja. Časopis za opća društvena pitanja, Vol. 18, Nr. 3 (101); Zagreb, 2009, pp 461–78

External links
 Đakovačko-osječka nabiskupija

 

Đakovo
Tourist attractions in Osijek-Baranja County
Catholic Church in Croatia
Roman Catholic churches completed in 1882
Buildings and structures in Osijek-Baranja County
Roman Catholic cathedrals in Croatia
19th-century Roman Catholic church buildings in Croatia